Haplochromis turkanae , theTurkana haplochromis, also known in brief as Turkana haplo, is a species of cichlid endemic to Lake Turkana.  This species reaches a length of  SL.

References 

Freshwater fish of Kenya
Fish of Lake Turkana
turkanae
Fish described in 1974
Taxonomy articles created by Polbot